The UK Rock & Metal Albums Chart is a record chart which ranks the best-selling rock and heavy metal albums in the United Kingdom. Compiled and published by the Official Charts Company, the data is based on each album's weekly physical sales, digital downloads and streams. In 2001, there were 16 albums that topped the 52 published charts. The first number-one album of the year was Coldplay's debut studio album Parachutes, which remained at number one for the first two weeks of the year at the end of a nine-week run which began on 4 November 2000. The final number-one album of the year was Linkin Park's debut studio album Hybrid Theory, which spent the last four weeks of the year (and the first two weeks of 2002) at number one in its fourth spell of the year at the top of the chart.

The most successful album on the UK Rock & Metal Albums Chart in 2001 was Hybrid Theory, which spent a total of 18 weeks at number one over four spells, including two separate runs of six consecutive weeks (three including the final run, which finished in 2002). Hybrid Theory was the best-selling rock and metal album of the year, ranking 13th in the UK End of Year Albums Chart. Coldplay's Parachutes spent six weeks at number one in 2001; Limp Bizkit's Chocolate Starfish and the Hot Dog Flavored Water was number one for five weeks during the year; Staind's Break the Cycle topped the chart four weeks in 2001; Muse's Origin of Symmetry and the self-titled debut album by Wheatus were number one for three weeks; and three additional albums spent two weeks each at number one.

Chart history

See also
2001 in British music
List of UK Rock & Metal Singles Chart number ones of 2001

References

External links
Official UK Rock & Metal Albums Chart Top 40 at the Official Charts Company
The Official UK Top 40 Rock Albums at BBC Radio 1

2001 in British music
UK Rock and Metal Albums
2001